Tyler Beck Goodspeed (born 1984/1985) is an American economist and economic historian who was the acting chairman of the Council of Economic Advisers from June 2020 to January 2021. He resigned from his position on January 7, in the wake of the 2021 storming of the United States Capitol.

Early life and education
Goodspeed was born in Exeter, New Hampshire and graduated from Phillips Exeter Academy in 2003. He received his BA in economics and history, summa cum laude, from Harvard University in 2008, an MPhil in economic and social history from Emmanuel College, Cambridge on a Gates Cambridge Scholarship in 2009, and returned to Harvard for his MA in 2011 and PhD in history, specializing in economic history, in 2014. His dissertation, Upon Daedalian Wings of Paper Money: Adam Smith, Free Banking, and the Financial Crisis of 1772, was supervised by a committee with Niall Ferguson, Benjamin M. Friedman, Richard Hornbeck, and Emma Georgina Rothschild. He also received a PhD in economics from Cambridge University.

Career 
He was a junior research fellow (postdoc) in economics at St. John’s College at Oxford University from 2014 to 2017 and a lecturer in economics in the Department of Political Economy at King's College London from 2016 to 2017.

In 2012, he published Rethinking the Keynesian Revolution: Keynes, Hayek, and the Wicksell Connection. His 2016 book, Legislating Instability: Adam Smith, Free Banking, and the Financial Crisis of 1722, analyses the collapse of the Ayr Bank in the Crisis of 1772. His 2017 book, Famine and Finance: Credit and the Great Famine of Ireland, analyzes the role of credit markets in mitigating the impact of adverse environmental shocks.

He joined the Council of Economic Advisers in 2017 as senior economist and then chief economist for macroeconomic policy. He became a member in 2019. Upon the resignation of Tomas J. Philipson, Goodspeed became acting Chair on June 23, 2020. Goodspeed resigned from the CEA on January 7, 2021, following the 2021 storming of the United States Capitol. His chief of staff released a statement saying "The events at the U.S. Capitol yesterday led Tyler to conclude his position was untenable."

In March 2021 he became the Kleinheinz Fellow at the Hoover Institution at Stanford University.

Personal life 
Goodspeed is married to fellow academic Oliver McPherson-Smith.

Books

References

External links
 
 
 

Living people
21st-century American historians
21st-century American male writers
Academics of King's College London
Alumni of Emmanuel College, Cambridge
American economic historians
American male non-fiction writers
Fellows of St John's College, Oxford
Gay academics
Gay politicians
Harvard College alumni
Historians from New Hampshire
LGBT appointed officials in the United States
LGBT conservatism in the United States
People from Exeter, New Hampshire
Phillips Exeter Academy alumni
United States Council of Economic Advisers
Year of birth missing (living people)